Guillermo Martín Farré (born 16 August 1981) is an Argentine football manager and former player who played as a midfielder. He is the current manager of Belgrano.

Career
Farré played club football for Belgrano. He scored a famous goal in the second leg of the club's 2010–11 Primera B Nacional promotion playoff victory over River Plate.

After he retired from playing, Farré became an assistant of Ricardo Zielinski at Estudiantes de La Plata before becoming the manager of former side Belgrano on 19 May 2021. He led Belgrano to the 2022 Primera Nacional title.

Honours

Manager
Belgrano
Primera Nacional: 2022

References

External links
 
 

1981 births
Living people
Argentine footballers
Association football midfielders
Argentine Primera División players
Central Córdoba de Rosario footballers
Club Atlético Belgrano footballers
Club Atlético Sarmiento footballers
Club Atlético Mitre footballers
Estudiantes de Río Cuarto footballers
Argentine football managers
Club Atlético Belgrano managers